Christian counseling is distinct from secular counseling. According to the International Association of Biblical Counselors, Biblical counseling "seeks to carefully discover those areas in which a Christian may be disobedient to the principles and commands of Scripture and to help him learn how to lovingly submit to God's will." Christian counselors, therefore, approach psychology through the lens of the Bible. They see the Bible as the source of all truth.

History
Christian counseling began between the late 1960s and early 1970s with the Biblical Counseling Movement directed by Jay E. Adams. Adams's 1970 book Competent to Counsel
advocated a Christian-based approach which differed from the psychological and psychiatric solutions of the time. As a devout Protestant, Adams believed that it was the job of the church to heal people who he believed were morally corrupt, but labeled by society as mentally ill. He rejected other models of counseling, such as the medical model, which gave clients a medical diagnosis based on a list of their behaviors or actions.  Adams believed the lists of maladaptive behaviors listed under each diagnostic category were actually behaviors emanating from our volitional nature, rather than an illness.  Maladaptive behaviors, he maintained, are a matter of sin and therefore subject to confrontation and education in God's word, exhorting the client to choose behavior that is obedient to God's word, thus removing the sin in their life.  Adams disagreed with any attempt to reclassify behavior that removed people from complete responsibility for their choices.

Adams gained converts but also lost popularity among people as well.
Adams' model of Nouthetic counseling identifies many scriptures that a counselor may use to exhort clients to change their behavior and come into obedience and away from sin.  The term "nouthetic" derives from the Greek word noutheteo, meaning "to admonish".

Prior to this movement, counseling had become something more secular and not associated with the church. Charles Darwin questioned the book of Genesis and how life began in his book On the Origin of Species, published in 1859. This caused panic in religious traditions which hold a literalist view of the Genesis creation narrative because it called into question everything that they believed. In a similar vein, Wilhelm Wundt (1832-1920), known as the "father of experimental psychology", sought to explain psychological phenomena in naturalistic terms through careful observation and introspection. He sought to develop psychology into an experimental science that did not simply accept theistic explanations for phenomena. He was one of the main drivers behind psychology being considered a science rather than a nonscientific philosophy. In addition to Wundt, Sigmund Freud (1856-1939) believed that the belief in God stems from an individual's experiences with their own father. He stated that an individual's relationship with God is often similar to their relationship with their own father, whether good or bad, and can develop over an individual's lifespan in similar ways to their relationship with their father. He also believed that the relationship between father and son, mediated by an early Oedipus complex, could lead to a "father complex" and subsequent belief in the existence of an exalted and glorified father figure. He developed psychotherapy apart from the church. These were driving factors behind why the responsibility of counseling was moved away from the church and began to be secularized. The church began to fall behind the ever-changing scientific field that seemed to blossom quickly. When Adams did come along he brought the attention back to the church but his influence faded in the 1980s only to be continued by David Powlison. Powlison converted to Christianity in his adult life and became extremely influential in this movement, publishing a journal, the Journal of Biblical Counseling, which made his beliefs known. Because of his work, Biblical counselors reflected on their movement and began to seek ways that it could improve which had never really been called into question before. Powlison aimed to advance what Adams had started.

Integration with psychology
Efforts to combine counseling, psychotherapy or other scientific or academic endeavors with Christian or other religious perspectives or approaches are sometimes called "integration".  Integration of academic subjects with theology has a long history in academia and continues in many colleges and universities that have continued their founding religious underpinnings. There are multiple kinds of integration, as it has been defined differently over the years. The way in which Christianity has been integrated with psychology thus far is by considering the ways in which psychology and the Bible agree and not integrating the teachings of psychology that don't agree with the Bible. While this tactic is still in progress and continuing to be looked at, there have been significant efforts to try and integrate the two. Stanton Jones and Richard Buteman came up with a list of three different methods on how to integrate psychology and the Christian faith. The methods are called pragmatic eclecticism, metatheoretical eclecticism, and theoretical integration. The first method, pragmatic eclecticism, looks at the best solutions for resolving patients' problems based on previous research comparing different methods that have been used. The second method is concerned with the effectiveness of the counselor and looks at the tactics they are using that are beneficial and those that are not. The third method takes theories that are previously existing and makes that the baseline from which further research can build upon. What all integrators of Christianity and psychology do believe as underlying truth is that all truth is God's truth.

Principles
Christian counseling focuses on a few main principles. It focuses on a holistic approach. One that can help with the individuals mind, spirit, and bodies well-being. Another term often used is "soul-care". This approach is to incorporate Christian views from the Bible, and include traditional beliefs and values. It encourages diving into an individuals mental, spiritual, and physiological health with the aid of God throughout the process. The aim of Christian counseling is to help people regain a sense of hope for their life that is found in Jesus Christ. Christian counseling believes that at the core of what they do is to help others achieve a better understanding of themselves and God which is rooted in the Holy Spirit's conviction. Christian counselors seek to make people aware of the sin in their lives that has caused them suffering but also come to know the immense worth and value they have as a person to God.

Powlison's Diagnostic Questions
Regarding the field of Christian counselling the American author David Powlison offers a diagnostic in tabular form, also known as Powlison's Diagnostic Questions Diagram. Thus, the diagram is utilized through an array of questions as the counsellor and the counselled proceed through the diagnostic modules. Powlison talks mainly about six modules; the first step is to examine the "stuff of life". Afterwards it is upon the counsellor to tackle four central modules, namely "Growth and Fruit", "Response and Thorns", "Motives and Heart", and "Transformation". In closing, Polwison recommends to focus on looking to Jesus in the final module which he refers to as "Cross-Based Solutions".

Criticism
Jay E. Adams published Competent to Counsel in 1970, criticizing the influence of psychology throughout Christian counseling. He began the Nouthetic counseling movement which teaches that the Bible alone is sufficient for all counseling. While Nouthetic counseling is strictly based on the Biblical scriptures and the power of the Holy Spirit separate from any psychological implementations, Christian counseling tries to implement psychology and Christianity still keeping God and biblical truths in the picture. While they do not take psychology as the absolute answer or solution to problems that people face, it is used as a tool in unity with Christianity to help people have a deeper understanding of themselves and God.

References

External links

Christian practices
Counseling
Christianity and medicine